Ernst J. Hoesly (June 16, 1885 – May 5, 1948) was a politician, farmer, and businessman.

Born in New Glarus, Wisconsin, Hoesly graduated from New Glarus High School and then went to Northwestern Business College in Naperville, Illinois. Hoesly was a cattle dealer and was president of the New Glarus State Bank. Hoesly served as assistant postmaster, served on the Green County, Wisconsin Board of Supervisors, and was chairman of the board. He also served as village clerk of New Glarus. From 1927 to 1939, Hoesly served in the Wisconsin State Assembly and was a Progressive. Hoesly died at his home in New Glarus, Wisconsin.

Notes

1885 births
1948 deaths
People from New Glarus, Wisconsin
Farmers from Wisconsin
Businesspeople from Wisconsin
Wisconsin Progressives (1924)
County supervisors in Wisconsin
Members of the Wisconsin State Assembly
20th-century American politicians
20th-century American businesspeople